Ellis Baker (b.1898 - 1984) was an American theatre actress.

She appeared on Broadway in Brook (1923), The Arabian (1927), These Few Ashes (1928) and Lady Windermere's Fan (1932).

Baker was married to the stage and film actor Fredric March from 1924 until 1927. Ellis Baker was the daughter of playwright Edith Ellis, whose plays were popular in the United States and London during the early part of the 20th century.

References

External links
The Two Edith Ellises by Felicia Hardison Londré

1898 births
American stage actresses
1984 deaths
20th-century American actresses